Nandangadda is a coastal village located in Karwar Taluka of Uttara Kannada district, in the Indian state of Karnataka.

Main Attraction
 The Jai Shri Santoshimata Temple located in Nandangadda is a must visit. 
 The view of the Kali river estuary merging with the Arabian sea can be seen from here.
 The above said view is better seen from an age old temple by name Naagnaath Temple also known as Aarav in the local language of konkani spoken by the majority residents. This temple is dedicated to the Lord Snake King.

Landmarks in Nandangadda
 Naagnaath Temple located on the beds of Kali River.
Samadevi Devasthan - The oldest and famous landmark of this village
 Sree Samadevi Mangal Karyalaya - A community hall catering for functions - The old Smita Talkies once stood here, before it was pulled down.
 Jai Shri Santoshimata Temple located on the coastline.
Gindi Devi temple 
Nandangadda Fish Market

See also 
 Ankola
 Mangalore

References 

Villages in Uttara Kannada district